Proditrix tetragona is a species of moth in the family Glyphipterigidae first described by George Hudson in 1918. It is endemic to New Zealand.

References

Moths described in 1918
Moths of New Zealand
Plutellidae
Endemic fauna of New Zealand
Taxa named by George Hudson
Endemic moths of New Zealand